Jeju may refer to:
 Jeju Island (Jejudo), an island near South Korea
 Jeju Province (formerly transliterated Cheju), a province of South Korea comprising Jejudo
Jeju City, the biggest city on Jejudo
Jeju dog, a dog native to Jejudo
Jeju language, the Koreanic language spoken on Jejudo
Jeju people
 Jeju Black, a cattle breed from the island
Jeju Air, an airline operating from Jejudo
 Jeju Bank, the subsidiary of Shinhan Bank
 Jeju (woreda), one of the 180 woredas district in the Oromia Region of Ethiopia
 Jeju Shinhwa World, a fully integrated South Korean resort located on Jeju Island
 Hoplerythrinus unitaeniatus, an Amazonian fish known as jeju

Language and nationality disambiguation pages